Seamonsters is the third studio album by English rock band The Wedding Present. It was recorded in ten days in 1991 by American producer Steve Albini at Pachyderm Studio in Cannon Falls, Minnesota. Albini had previously earlier recorded two EPs with the group; Brassneck and 3 Songs and, with those records, Seamonsters has a rougher, harsher sound than the group's earlier two albums.

In deliberate contrast to the full sentences featured on previous recordings—something for which the group had often been parodied within the music press—all of the songs on Seamonsters have one-word titles. The album enjoyed a strongly positive critical reception. Guitarist Peter Solowka was sacked between the recording and release of the album, replaced by Paul Dorrington.

Reception

Rockdelux ranked the album the 5th best album of the year on their year-end list. In 1999, Ned Raggett ranked the album at number 10 on his list of "The Top 136 Or So Albums Of The Nineties". Alternative Press ranked it #81 and #18 in their lists of "The 90 Greatest Albums of the 90s" and "Top 99 Albums of '85 to '95" respectively. Stylus ranked it at #200 on their "Top 101-200 Albums of All time" list. The Guardian included it on their list of "1000 Albums to Hear Before You Die". Rockdelux also ranked it at #46 on their list of "The 150 Best Albums from the 90s".

Track listing
All songs written by David Gedge unless otherwise noted.

"Dalliance" – 4:24
"Dare" – 3:45
"Suck" – 3:58
"Blonde" – 5:07
"Rotterdam" – 3:15
"Lovenest" – 5:10
"Corduroy" – 3:28
"Carolyn" – 3:39
"Heather" – 3:32
"Octopussy" – 6:21

U.S. edition 
In addition to the original ten tracks, this edition added three bonus tracks.

"Niagara" - 4:06
"Dan Dare" - 1:40
"Fleshworld" - 4:26

2001 reissue 
The album was remastered and reissued in 2001 with additional songs from the 3 Songs EP and the Dalliance and Lovenest singles.
"Make Me Smile (Come Up and See Me)" (Steve Harley) - 3:44
"Crawl" - 2:44
"Corduroy" (single version) - 3:23
"She's My Best Friend" (Lou Reed) - 2:55
"Niagara" - 4:06
"Mothers" (Jean-Paul Sartre Experience) - 2:56
"Dan Dare" - 1:40
"Fleshworld" - 4:26

Personnel
David Gedge - vocals, guitar
Peter Solowka - guitar
Keith Gregory - bass
Simon Smith - drums

References

External links
 Review of Seamonsters at Dailymusicguide

The Wedding Present albums
1991 albums
Albums produced by Steve Albini
RCA Records albums